The 1977 CECAFA Cup was the fifth edition of the tournament. It was held in Somalia, and was won by Uganda. All matches were played in Mogadishu Stadium, between November 25 and December 12.

Group A

Group B

Semi-finals

Third place match

Final

References

Rsssf info

CECAFA Cup
CECAFA
International sports competitions hosted by Somalia